Yitzhak Rabin is a 1998 reggae album by the Ivorian artist Alpha Blondy.

Track listing

Personnel
Alpha Blondy – lead vocals

References

1998 albums
Alpha Blondy albums